The Eastern Hutt River is a river of New Zealand. It flows southwest from the Tararua Range to join with the Western Hutt River and become the Hutt River, a major river of the southern North Island.

See also
List of rivers of New Zealand

References

Land Information New Zealand - Search for Place Names

Rivers of the Wellington Region
Rivers of New Zealand